John Livingstone Brown (February 7, 1867 – March 20, 1953) was a Canadian politician, farmer and minister. He was elected to the House of Commons of Canada in the 1921 election as a Member of the Progressive Party. He moved to the Liberal-Progressives after the 1926 election and was re-elected in 1930.

1867 births
1953 deaths
Liberal-Progressive MPs
Progressive Party of Canada MPs